Taylor Nicole Smith (born December 1, 1993) is an American soccer player who plays as a defender for NJ/NY Gotham FC of the National Women's Soccer League (NWSL). She also played for the United States national team at both senior and youth levels. Smith helped lead the UCLA Bruins women's soccer team to its first-ever national title in 2013.

Early life
Born and raised in Fort Worth, Texas, Smith attended Fort Worth Country Day School where she captained the varsity soccer team for three years. She also played field hockey and ran track and field. Smith earned conference honors in both soccer and track. She was ranked as the eighth top national college recruit by Top Drawer Soccer and ESPN. Top Drawer Soccer ranked her as the top recruit in the state of Texas and she was twice named Youth All-American by the National Soccer Coaches Association of America (NSCAA). The Fort Worth Star-Telegram named Smith to their Super Team twice.

Smith played club soccer for Solar Chelsea.  She helped the LA Blues win the USL W-League title in 2014.

UCLA Bruins, 2012–2015 
Smith attended UCLA where she played for the Bruins from 2012 to 2015. During her freshman season, she played in all 23 games, starting 17. Her three goals ranked eighth in the Pac-12 Conference and 20 points ranked tenth in points. Smith was named to the Pac-12 All-Freshman Team Top Drawer Soccer All-Freshman Team. During her sophomore season, her 8 goals ranked second on the team. Her 11 assists and 26 points both ranked third in the Pac-12. Smith started in 25 of the 26 games in which she played. During the NCAA Division 1 quarterfinals, she scored the game-winning golden goal in double overtime to lift the team past North Carolina and into the semifinals. Her three goals during the tournament helped the team clinch its first NCAA Division 1 College Cup title. Smith was named to the All-Pac-12 first team. During her junior season, Smith started in all 24 games. Her nine goals scored and four game-winning goals tied for second on the team. Her 23 points ranked third on the team and eighth in the conference. As a senior, she co-captained the team and was named to the MAC Hermann Trophy Watch List.

Club career

Western New York Flash/North Carolina Courage, 2016–2017 
Smith was named to the Western New York Flash opening day roster for the 2016 NWSL season. She made twenty appearances for the club and scored two goals. The team's fourth-place finish during the regular season with a  record secured the team a berth to the playoffs. After defeating the Portland Thorns FC 4–3 in extra time during the semifinal, the Flash faced the Washington Spirit in the final and won the game in a penalty kick shootout after finishing 2–2 in extra time. Three months after the win, the Western New York Flash was sold to the ownership group of North Carolina FC and moved to Cary, North Carolina where they became the North Carolina Courage.

Washington Spirit, 2018
In January 2018, Smith was traded to the Washington Spirit along with teammate Ashley Hatch in exchange for Crystal Dunn's rights. Prior to the start of the season, Smith was added to the allocated player list by U.S. Soccer. She appeared in 23 games for Washington in the 2018 season.

Loan to Newcastle Jets, 2018
In October 2018, after the conclusion NWSL season, Smith signed with the Newcastle Jets on loan for the 2018–19 W-League season. She became a key player in her first several appearances, earning the team's Player of the Month honors in November. In mid-December, Smith suffered an ACL tear in the 86th minute against Perth Glory after having registered two assists to fellow on-loan American, Katie Stengel.

Reign FC, 2019–2020
On March 22, 2019, Reign FC announced that they had signed Smith through the discovery process for former allocated players. Due to the injury she suffered in the W-League, Smith is not expected to play during the 2019 NWSL season.

North Carolina Courage, 2021–2022
On December 7, 2020, Smith was acquired by North Carolina Courage in a trade for Ally Watt. She parted ways with the club on June 21, 2022.

NJ/NY Gotham FC, 2022–
On June 24, 2022, NJ/NY Gotham FC signed Smith off waivers.

International career
In January 2017, Smith was called into training camp for the United States women's national soccer team for the first time by head coach Jill Ellis. She earned her first cap for the team on July 27 when she started in the right back defender position during a match in Seattle against Australia at the 2017 Tournament of Nations.

Smith was named to the U.S roster for the 2018 SheBelieves Cup, she started two games as the United States won the tournament for the second time.

Personal life
Smith came out publicly as a lesbian in 2017.

Honors

International
SheBelieves Cup: 2018

Club
Western New York Flash
NWSL Champions: 2016

North Carolina Courage
NWSL Shield: 2017

College
UCLA
 NCAA Women's Soccer Championship: 2013

References

External links

 U.S. Soccer player profile
 
 North Carolina Courage player profile
 UCLA player profile
 

1993 births
Living people
American women's soccer players
UCLA Bruins women's soccer players
Western New York Flash players
National Women's Soccer League players
Sportspeople from Fort Worth, Texas
Soccer players from Texas
Women's association football forwards
United States women's under-20 international soccer players
North Carolina Courage players
United States women's international soccer players
Women's association football defenders
American LGBT sportspeople
LGBT people from Texas
Lesbian sportswomen
LGBT association football players
LGBT African Americans
African-American women's soccer players
Washington Spirit players
Newcastle Jets FC (A-League Women) players
OL Reign players
21st-century African-American sportspeople
21st-century African-American women